Nansen is a surname which is mostly used in the Scandinavian countries. People with the surname are as follows:

 Antz Nansen (born 1983), New Zealand boxer
 Baby Nansen (born 1987) New Zealand boxer
 Brandon Nansen (born 1993), New Zealand rugby player
 Betty Nansen (1873–1943), Danish actress and theater director
 Eigil Nansen (1931–2017), Norwegian athlete and architect; son of Odd Nansen
 Eva Nansen (1858–1907), Norwegian opera singer
 Fridtjof Nansen (1861–1930), Norwegian scientist, polar explorer and diplomat
 Hans Nansen (1598–1667), Danish statesman
 Johnny Nansen (born 1974), Samoan-born American football player
 Karin Nansen, Uruguayan activist
 Odd Nansen (1901–1973), Norwegian architect and humanitarian; son of Fridtjof Nansen
 Peter Nansen (1861–1918), Danish novelist, journalist, and publisher

Danish-language surnames
Norwegian-language surnames